This article is a summary of 1978 in Australian television.

Events
20 March – Channel 0 launches its one-hour news service Eyewitness News with Bruce Mansfield as host.
August – The ABC televises the 1978 Commonwealth Games from Edmonton, Alberta, Canada. The opening and closing ceremonies are televised live, with event highlights each day.
12 September – The very first major mini-series produced for Australian commercial television with a budget of over a million dollars Against the Wind is screen on Seven Network. It is also the first major Australian TV production to be broadcast in the United States.
September – The Federal Government gives the go-ahead for the launch of a multicultural television service, to be operated by the Special Broadcasting Service (SBS), with the expectation of the new channel operating in Sydney and Melbourne by 1980.
October – Channel 0 makes a request to the Federal Government for permission to change its broadcast frequency to Network Ten.
7 November – The 0-10 Network televises the Melbourne Cup to a national audience for the first time. The telecast is regarded as one of the largest national sports telecasts mounted to date.
64% of Melbourne and 70% of Sydney households now own colour TV sets, giving Australia one of the fastest changeovers to colour in the world.
Graham Kennedy wins a Logie award for presenting Blankety Blanks.

Debuts

New International Programming
2 January/29 November –  The Whiteoaks of Jalna (2 January: The 0-10 Network - Melbourne, 29 November: The 0-10 Network - Sydney)
19 January/4 July –  Quincy, M.E. (19 January: Seven Network - Melbourne, 4 July: Seven Network - Sydney)
4 February –  Far Out Space Nuts (The 0-10 Network)
6 February –  Man from Atlantis (Seven Network)
8 February –  The Fall and Rise of Reginald Perrin (ABC TV)
7 February –  Robin's Nest (ABC TV)
8 February/21 February –  The Love Boat (8 February: The 0-10 Network - TV movie, 21 February: Nine Network - TV series)
16 February –  Kingston: Confidential (The 0-10 Network)
17 February –  Open All Hours (ABC TV)
17 February –  Big Hawaii (The 0-10 Network)
18 March –  McDuff, the Talking Dog (Nine Network)
20 March –  The Kids from 47A (ABC TV)
3 April –  The New Adventures of Batman (The 0-10 Network)
3 April/7 November –  Another Bouquet (3 April: Seven Network - Sydney, 7 November: Seven Network - Melbourne)
7 April –  Soap (ABC TV)
10 April –  Tarzan, Lord of the Jungle (The 0-10 Network)
1 May –  Children of the Stones (ABC TV)
8 May –  The Blue Knight (The 0-10 Network)
9 May –  Miss Jones and Son (ABC TV)
9 May –  Clue Club (Nine Network)
13 May –  Uncle Croc's Block (Nine Network)
13 May –  James at 15 (Seven Network)
18 May –  Noddy (ABC TV)
30 May –  Mr. Men (ABC TV)
5 June –  Mind Your Language (Seven Network)
19 June –  Nashville 99 (Seven Network)
21 June/19 July –  Yabba Dabba Doo! The Happy World of Hanna-Barbera (21 June: Nine Network - Sydney, 19 July: Nine Network - Melbourne)
22 June –  Rocky O'Rourke (ABC TV)
26 June –  Chorlton and the Wheelies (ABC TV)
28 June –  The Flockton Flyer (ABC TV)
28 June –  Sailor (ABC TV)
6 July –  Fantasy Island (Nine Network)
19 August –  Bugs and Daffy's Carnival of the Animals (The 0-10 Network)
20 August –  The Life and Times of Grizzly Adams (TV series) (The 0-10 Network)
28 August –  Jamie and the Magic Torch (ABC TV)
2 September –  Space Academy (The 0-10 Network)
9 September –  The Skatebirds (Nine Network)
9 September –  The Krofft Supershow (Nine Network)
11 September –  The Red Hand Gang (The 0-10 Network)
13 October –  Three's Company (ABC TV) 
23 October –  Who Pays the Ferryman? (ABC TV)
24 October –  Armchair Thriller (ABC TV)
27 October –  Flower Stories (ABC TV)
6 November –  C.P.O. Sharkey (Nine Network)
7 November –  Carter Country (Seven Network)
7 November –  The Oregon Trail (Seven Network)
8 November –  Rosetti and Ryan (Nine Network)
11 November –  Future Cop (Nine Network)
30 November –  Loves Me, Loves Me Not (Seven Network)
30 November –  Sha Na Na (Seven Network)
7 December –  Citizen Smith (ABC TV)
8 December –  The McLean Stevenson Show (The 0-10 Network)
23 December –  Good Heavens (Nine Network)
 CHiPS (Nine Network - Brisbane)
 Kum-Kum (The 0-10 Network)
 Star Trek: The Animated Series (Nine Network)

Television shows

1950s
 Mr. Squiggle and Friends (1959–1999)

1960s
 Four Corners (1961–present)

1970s
 Hey Hey It's Saturday (1971–1999, 2009–2010)
 Young Talent Time (1971–1988)
 Countdown (1974–1987)
 The Don Lane Show (1975–1983)
 The Naked Vicar Show (1977–1978)

Ending this year

Returning this year
No shows returning this year.

See also
 1978 in Australia
 List of Australian films of 1978

References